The following lists events that happened during 1885 in South Africa.

Incumbents
 Governor of the Cape of Good Hope and High Commissioner for Southern Africa: Hercules Robinson.
 Governor of the Colony of Natal: Henry Ernest Gascoyne Bulwer.
 State President of the Orange Free State: Jan Brand.
 State President of the South African Republic: Paul Kruger.
 Prime Minister of the Cape of Good Hope: Thomas Upington.

Events
February
 26 – The Berlin Conference ends and the Scramble for Africa begins.

September
 30 – A British force abolishes the Boer republic of Stellaland and adds it to British Bechuanaland.

November
 28 – The railway line from Cape Town to Kimberley is completed.

Births
 31 January – Marthinus Johannes de Jong, landscape painter, is born in Amsterdam, the Netherlands.

Deaths

Railways

Railway lines opened
 2 September – Cape Eastern – Molteno to Aliwal North, .
 28 November – Cape Western – Oranjerivier to Kimberley, .<
 21 December – Natal – Merrivale to Estcourt, .

References

 
South Africa
South Africa
1880s in South Africa
Years of the 19th century in South Africa